Abdulaziz Oboshqra [عبد العزيز بو شقراءin Arabic] (born 23 November 1981) is a Saudi football player.

Honours
Al-Fateh SC
Saudi Professional League: 2012–13
Saudi Super Cup: 2013

References

External links 
 

Living people
1981 births
People from Al-Hasa
Association football defenders
Saudi Arabian footballers
Al-Fateh SC players
Hajer FC players
Al-Adalah FC players
Al-Nojoom FC players
Al-Nahda Club (Saudi Arabia) players
Al Jeel Club players
Saudi First Division League players
Saudi Professional League players